"Keanu Reeves" is a song by American rapper Logic from his fifth studio album, Confessions of a Dangerous Mind (2019). Written by Logic and its producers AG and 6ix, it was released on January 18, 2019 by Visionary Music Group and Def Jam Recordings as the album's lead single. It peaked at number 38 at the US Billboard Hot 100.

Charts

Certifications

References

External links
 

Songs about actors
2019 songs
2019 singles
Def Jam Recordings singles
Logic (rapper) songs
Songs written by 6ix (record producer)
Songs written by Logic (rapper)